Pollenia atrifemur is a species of cluster fly in the family Polleniidae.

Distribution
New Zealand.

References

Polleniidae
Insects described in 1930
Taxa named by John Russell Malloch
Diptera of Australasia